The Chosen One: Legend of the Raven is a 1998 B-movie directed by Lawrence Lanoff, co-written by Khara Bromiley and Sam Rappaport, and distributed by Troma Films. It stars Carmen Electra and Lawrence Lanoff.

Plot
When a serial killer mysteriously and savagely murders a young native woman in rural Los Angeles County, her sister McKenna (Carmen Electra) must replace her as the keeper of an amulet, the sacred crescent. Reluctantly, McKenna accepts the role of chosen one. With the amulet and after the rigors of the ritual, she takes on the spirit and powers of the raven, the good forces in the battle against evil, the wolf. McKenna's powers include a thirst for milk and tremendous sexual energy, which she unleashes on her former boyfriend, Henry, a cop. The spirit of the wolf inhabits Rose, Henry's jilted lover. Rose wreaks havoc of her own before a final showdown with the chosen one.

External links

1998 direct-to-video films
1998 films
American supernatural thriller films
Troma Entertainment films
1998 crime thriller films
1990s English-language films
1990s American films